Wollert Nygren (24 December 1906 – 3 March 1988) was a Norwegian Olympic speed skater.

He was born and died in Oslo, and represented Oslo SK. He participated at the 1928 Winter Olympics in St. Moritz, where he placed 13th in 1500 metre speedskating.

References

External links

1906 births
1988 deaths
Norwegian male speed skaters
Olympic speed skaters of Norway
Speed skaters at the 1928 Winter Olympics
Sportspeople from Oslo